

Buildings and structures

Buildings

 1550–1554 – Church of Sant'Andrea in Via Flaminia, Rome, designed by Giacomo Barozzi da Vignola, constructed, the first church of the Italian Renaissance to have an elliptical dome.
 1550–1557 – Süleymaniye Mosque in Istanbul, designed by Mimar Sinan, constructed.
 1552–1554 – Design and construction of Villa Cornaro in the Veneto by Palladio.
 1552 – Work begins on Fort Saint Elmo on Malta.
 1554
 Work begins on Saint Basil's Cathedral in Moscow.
 Work begins on Sulaymaniyya Takiyya (western building) in Damascus.
 c. 1555 – Design and construction of monastery of Santiago Apóstol and its basilica church in Cuilapan de Guerrero, Oaxaca, Mexico, by Antonio de Barbosa, begins.
 1558 – Sforza Chapel in Basilica di Santa Maria Maggiore, Rome, designed by Michelangelo.
 1559
 Work begins on the Villa Farnese at Caprarola, designed by Vignola.
 Sulaymaniyya Takiyya (western building) in Damascus is completed.

Births
 1550: April 18 – Alessandro Pieroni, Italian mannerist painter and architect (died 1607)
 c.1550 – Vittorio Cassar, Maltese architect (died c.1607)
 1556 – Carlo Maderno, Ticinese-born baroque architect (died 1629)

Deaths
 1554 – Sebastiano Serlio (born 1475)

References

Architecture